Christopher Adam Keyser (born 1960) is an American producer and writer of primetime dramas. He is best known for creating the television series The Society and Party of Five.

Early life
Keyser was born to a Jewish family on Long Island, New York.  He attended Harvard College and Harvard Law School in Cambridge, Massachusetts. In college, he was the president of the Harvard University Debate Council. Keyser became involved in theater during his last two years at Harvard College, appearing in a number of theatrical productions. He went on to Harvard Law School, from which he graduated with honors and received offers of employment from various New York City law firms. During law school, however, Keyser became focused on screenwriting; while there he met future writing partner Amy Lippman. While in New York City, Keyser and Lippman formed a writing partnership.

Career
In 1988, Keyser and Lippman moved to Los Angeles, California and were signed on to write teleplays for L.A. Law and Equal Justice.  From 1991 to 1996, they also wrote for and produced the shows Sisters and Eddie Dodd.

They became known as an established team in the TV business. The two are best known for the Fox series Party of Five, a primetime family-oriented soap opera. The show featured the Salingers, a family suddenly orphaned when their parents are killed by a drunken man behind the wheel and the eldest son becomes the head of the family, while the eldest daughter wants to write professionally, the youngest daughter is a musical prodigy, and the family tries to stay together and keep the family restaurant business afloat. The show deals with issues involving relationships, romance, school, work, growing-up, and life and death. Both Keyser and Lippman are credited as the creators, executive producers, and writers of the series. The show lasted six seasons.

In 1996, the show took home the Golden Globe Award for "Best Drama Series." Keyser (along with Lippman) received the Humanitas Prize for the episode "Thanksgiving", where the Salingers wound up confronting the mysterious drunk driver that was responsible for their parent's deaths. Neve Campbell (who got her breakout role on the show) has referred to the show as "the most realistic show on television." Eventually, ratings waned and the show came to an end.

The team of Keyser/Lippman has continued to develop TV programs such as Significant Others and Time of Your Life (a spin-off of Party of Five starring Love Hewitt's character Sarah leaving San Francisco in favor of New York and searching for the biological family she never even knew she had).

In October 2013, it was announced that Keyser and Sydney Sidner were writing the script for a reboot of Charmed, which was in development at CBS. Keyser and Sidner were also going to executive produce the reboot alongside CBS Television Studios and The Tannenbaum Company. However, in August 2014, it was revealed that CBS were not going ahead with the reboot.

From 2011 through 2015, he was president of the Writers Guild of America, West.

Keyser was the creator, writer, and executive producer of the Netflix mystery drama, The Society, which premiered on May 10, 2019. The series received positive reivews; on July 9, 2019, it was renewed for a second season, which was set to be released in 2020. However, on August 21, 2020, Netflix reneged on the renewal deal and canceled the series, citing complications of the COVID-19 pandemic having led to cost increases and difficulty scheduling production. Keyser is currently the showrunner of HBO's acclaimed series Julia, starring Sarah Lancashire as the iconic chef.

Personal life
Keyser is not married to his frequent producing/writing partner Amy Lippman. They have both joked that they are married - just not to each other. While he was in law school, Keyser reconnected with a high school friend, who was also attending law school at Boston University. Their relationship blossomed and eventually they married. They have one daughter and one son and reside in Los Angeles, California.

References

External links

1960 births
Living people
People from Long Island
Writers from Los Angeles
American male screenwriters
Television producers from California
American television writers
Jewish American screenwriters
Harvard Law School alumni
Writers Guild of America Award winners
American male television writers
Screenwriters from California
Harvard College alumni
20th-century American screenwriters
20th-century American male writers
21st-century American screenwriters
21st-century American male writers
21st-century American Jews